This is a list of Neue Deutsche Härte bands.

Before 2000

2000-2010

After 2010

References

Neue
Lists of heavy metal bands